Majbrit Nielsen (born 17 June 1982) is a Danish rower. She competed in the women's quadruple sculls event at the 2004 Summer Olympics.

References

External links
 

1982 births
Living people
Danish female rowers
Olympic rowers of Denmark
Rowers at the 2004 Summer Olympics
People from Fredensborg Municipality
Sportspeople from the Capital Region of Denmark